Anurag Singh is an Indian film director. He is a Mumbai-based film director and writer known for Kesari which is the biggest blockbuster of 2019 in the Bollywood industry as well as for Punjab 1984, Jatt and Juliet Series and Yaar Annmulle. Jatt and Juliet series and Punjab 1984 are the top 3 highest grossers of Punjabi Cinema. He has also directed a Bollywood film Raqeeb which didn't do well at the box office. Anurag has assisted many blockbusters of Bollywood cinema. In 2005, he was married to his childhood sweetheart Madhurjeet Sarghi, a theatre artist and an actress who also hails from Jalandhar. In 2016 Anurag and Sarghi were blessed with a baby boy named Shivaye Anurag Singh. Anurag has an elder brother named Armaan Singh who is a well known chief engineer in California, United States. Anurag gets to interact a lot with kids especially his nephews and nieces who live in Jalandhar. Anurag made his production debut by producing Super Singh which broke many records, under his production company named as Brat Films. He has also produced Shadaa, which broke so many records, and Puaada, which is releasing in April 2021.

Early life
Anurag Singh was born on 17 November to Dr Charan Singh Thind and Dr Baljit Kaur. Singh was very brilliant in studies. This medical student went to Australia in search of his passion for movies. He was Class 10 CISCE topper and also got PMT Rank 1. In that year he broke several records. He grew up in Jalandhar and is currently living in Mumbai, Maharashtra.

Career
Singh began working in Punjabi cinema, breaking out with the movie Jatt & Juliet in 2012. In 2005, he was married to Madhurjeet Sarghi. He assisted Bollywood director Raj Kanwar for several years before directing a Bollywood movie for his production house. The film Raqeeb starring Jimmy Shergill  was commercially unsuccessful. Later Singh worked with Punjabi Arya Babbar for his first Punjabi language film Yaar Annmulle. Later he worked with actor Diljit Dosanjh in five films in the Punjabi language. Six of the films he directed starring Diljit Dosanjh were commercially very successful. He has been an assistant director and writer in Hum Aapke Hain Koun..!, Jurm and many more blockbusters of Bollywood.

Filmography

Awards

Won
 National Film Award for Best Feature Film in Punjabi - Punjab 1984
 PTC Punjabi Film Awards 2013 - Best Director - Jatt & Juliet
2012 - Best Director - Yaar Annmulle
 PTC Punjabi Film Awards 2014 - Best Screenplay - Jatt & Juliet 2  
 PTC Punjabi Film Awards 2015 - Best Story - Punjab 1984
 PTC Punjabi Film Awards 
2014 - Best Director - Jatt and Juliet 2
 PTC Punjabi Film Awards 2015 - (Critics Choice) Best Director - Punjab 1984
 PTC Punjabi Film Awards 2015 - Best Director - Punjab 1984
 PTC Punjabi Film Awards 2015 - Best Dialogues - Disco Singh
 PTC Punjabi Film Awards 2015 - Best Screenplay - Disco Singh

Nominated
 PTC Punjabi Film Awards 2012 - Best Screenplay & Dialogues - Yaar Annmulle
 PTC Punjabi Film Awards 2012 - Best Screenplay & Dialogues - Ek Noor
 PTC Punjabi Film Awards 
 PTC Punjabi Film Awards 2015 - Best Screenplay - Punjab 1984
 PTC Punjabi Film Awards 2015 - Best Screenplay - Disco Singh
 PTC Punjabi Film Awards 2015 - Best Dialogues - Punjab 1984

References

Living people
Punjabi-language film directors
People from Kapurthala district
Year of birth uncertain
Film directors from Punjab, India
21st-century Indian film directors
1978 births